In 1882, the French Third Republic established a protectorate over the Merina Kingdom on the island of Madagascar, with the consent of the United Kingdom. The French position on the island was solidified by the First Madagascar expedition (May 1883 to December 1885, the first phase of the Franco-Hova Wars). The protectorate lasted until 1897, when the French abolished the monarchy and turned the island into a colony, following the Second Madagascar expedition (December 1894 to September 1895, the second and last phase of the Franco-Hova Wars). Afterwards, Madagascar remained part of the French colonial empire until 1958, when the autonomous Malagasy Republic was established. The Republic gained full independence in 1960.

List

(Dates in italics indicate de facto continuation of office)

See also
 History of Madagascar
 Merina Kingdom
 List of Imerina monarchs
 Malagasy Protectorate
 French Madagascar
 Franco-Hova Wars
 French colonial empire

Sources
 http://www.rulers.org/rulm1.html#madagascar
 African States and Rulers, John Stewart, McFarland Heads of State and Government, 2nd Edition, John V da Graca, MacMillan Press (2000)

Government of Madagascar
Madagascar history-related lists

1882 establishments in Madagascar
1950s disestablishments in Africa